WAEW (1330 AM) is a radio station licensed to Crossville, Tennessee, United States.  The station is owned by Peg Broadcasting.

FM Translator
In addition to the main station on 1330 kHz, WAEW programming is relayed to an FM translator.  The FM translator provides improved coverage, especially at night when the AM station broadcasts with only 35 watts.

References

External links

AEW
Talk radio stations in the United States